Saphenista tufinoa is a species of moth of the family Tortricidae. It is found in Ecuador in the provinces of Cotopaxi and Carchi.

References

Moths described in 1999
Saphenista